Arkoudilas  is a forest area in ​​southern Corfu, Greece. Most famous monument of the location is its monastery.

The Monastery of Arkoudilas 
In the southern part of Corfu next to cape Asprokavos, a gravel road goes beyond the Cavos community, two kilometers further exists the hill of Panagia (Mother of Jesus) of Arkoudilas.  From atop the hill the whole area around Cavos and even the island of Paxos is visible. Golden sandy beaches dot the coast to the northwest.

Arkoudilas woods is approximately 250 acres full of cypresses, strawberry trees and other vegetation. Through the woods and on the top of the hill one can see the Panagia of Arkoudilas. The Catholic monastery was built in the 1700s according to the carved crest at the bell tower, which is actually the entrance. 
On the right side of the bell tower, visitors can see a wall whereas on the left side can see a form of fortress-like battlements.
As expanding the building we can see a two-story building named DURIS, probably from the English word TOR which means tower.
The tower was actually a form of monastery's fortressing against the pirates and other attackers.

The upper part of DURI was, according to its construction, a place of residence for the owners or the monks.  This is evidenced by a fireplace through an indoor stone staircase via a wooden catapult with ropes and reels which protected the monks or the owners from attacks.

The lower portion was used as a storage for goods such as wine and olive oil. The eastern part of the tower next to the fireplace there once contained a tunnel which led to the beach. The tunnel existed in order to protect people from any potential attacks.

Today, after the building was demolished exists a two-storey building from the northwest part with a both sided stair (Mpotso) which was the main entrance.

The building was once used to host the people who attended the festivals and the owners during the 15th of August. The honoring of Mother Marys' death. 
The monastery at its peak used to have festival goers on horses with clothes designed and prepared at the argalios.

Corfu